Palmiro Di Dio (born 6 July 1985) is an Italian former football (soccer) defender.

Football career
Ternana Calcio, which Relegated to Serie C1 in summer 2006, sold half of the player rights to Reggina Calcio, but he was bought back in summer 2007, and loaned to Bari on 30 August.

He was the unused member of Italian U-20 team on 2005 FIFA World Youth Championship.

External links
FIGC 

1985 births
Living people
Sportspeople from Benevento
Italian footballers
Italy youth international footballers
Reggina 1914 players
Serie A players
Serie B players
Association football defenders
Fermana F.C. players
S.S.C. Bari players
Calcio Foggia 1920 players
Ternana Calcio players
FC Lugano players
Footballers from Campania